Fridianus (also Frigidanus, Frigidian, Frigianu), was an Irish prince and hermit, fl. 6th century. Tradition names him as a son of King Ultach of Ulster. He later migrated to Italy, where he was appointed as Bishop of Lucca. The Basilica of San Frediano in the city is dedicated to him, as are churches in Florence.

Biography

Fridianus is venerated as a Christian saint of the 6th century and as a bishop of Lucca. The Basilica di San Frediano in Lucca is dedicated to him.

According to Catholic tradition, he was a prince of Ireland. He went on a pilgrimage to Rome, and later became a hermit on Mount Pisano, near Lucca. The Catholic Encyclopedia states: “Remarkable for sanctity and miracles was St. Fridianus (560-88), son of Ultonius, King of Ireland, or perhaps of a king of Ulster (Ultonia).”

According to his legend, Fridianus was brought up trained in Irish monasticism, and was taught by St Enda and St Colman. He was later ordained a priest. During his pilgrimage to Rome, he decided to dedicate his life to God in solitude and became a hermit, living on Mount Pisano, a mountainous area between the cities of Lucca and Pisa. In 556 AD, Pope John II persuaded him to take the bishopric of Lucca, which Fridianus accepted. He would often return to the countryside to spend his time in quiet prayer and solitude.

Fridianus became known for working miracles. His most famous one is considered a legend. The River Serchio, which ran past Lucca, often flooded the nearby city. The citizens became so distressed that they asked the bishop to come to their aid. Armed with a rake, Fridianus walked down to the river bank, and, strengthened by the prayers of the faithful, he commanded the waters of the Serchio to follow his rake. To the amazement of those gathered, the river followed Fridianus as he cut a path away from the city and the cultivated land on its outskirts.

During his episcopate, the city of Lucca was attacked by the Lombards. The cathedral was burnt down and Fridianus rebuilt it. He may also have founded a group of eremitical canon priests; these canons merged with the Canons Regular of the Lateran in 1507.

Fridianus had a church built on the spot of the present basilica, dedicated to Vincent of Saragossa, a martyr from Zaragoza, Spain. When Fridianus was buried in this church, the church was renamed as Ss. Frediano and Vincenzo. The church is now a major landmark and is regularly visited.

Fridianus is often confused with Finnian of Moville. But no formal connection has ever been made between the two.

See also
 Pellegrino of Ireland
 Emilian of Faenza
 Saint Gall
 Christian monasticism
 List of Catholic saints

References

External links

 San Frediano di Lucca

588 deaths
Bishops of Lucca
Italian hermits
6th-century Italian bishops
6th-century Christian saints
6th-century Irish bishops
Medieval Irish saints
Medieval Italian saints
Colombanian saints
Year of birth unknown